Ballin' Outta Control is the second studio album by American rapper AMG. It was released on June 6, 1995 by Select Records.

Track listing
 "Pimp of the Century"
 "304 Thang"
 "Leather And Wood"
 "A Playerz Analysis"
 "Be Mai Bitch"
 "Baby Is It Maybe?"
 "Around the World"
 "Sucka for Luv"
 "The Fly Away"
 "Butt Booty Naked"
 "Ballin' Outta Control"

Samples 
"Leather And Wood" samples "Juicy Fruit" by Mtume.
"Around The World" samples "What Would I Do If I Could Feel?" by Nipsey Russell.
"Sucka for Luv" samples "Close the Door" by Teddy Pendergrass.
"Butt Booty Naked" samples "Think (About It)" by Lyn Collins.

AMG (rapper) albums
1995 albums
Select Records albums